The following are public holidays in Tuvalu.

Also, the regions observe the following regional holidays:

References

Tuvalu
Holidays
Law of Tuvalu
Events in Tuvalu
Tuvalu